Kimball may refer to:

People
Kimball (surname)
Kimball (given name)

Places

Canada
 Kimball, Alberta

United States
 Kellogg, Iowa, formerly known as Kimball
 Kimball, Kansas
 Kimball, Minnesota
 Kimball, Nebraska, a city
 Kimball, South Dakota
 Kimball, Tennessee
 Kimball, West Virginia
 Kimball, Wisconsin, a town
 Kimball (community), Wisconsin, an unincorporated community
 Kimball County, Nebraska
 Kimball Township, Michigan
 Kimball Township, Jackson County, Minnesota
 Mount Kimball (Alaska)
 Mount Kimball (Arizona)
 Mount Kimball (Colorado)

Schools
 Kimball High School (disambiguation), several
 Kimball School, an elementary school in Concord, New Hampshire

Other uses
 Kimball O'Hara, title character of the novel Kim by Rudyard Kipling
 Kimbell Art Museum, Fort Worth, Texas
 Kimball dimensional modeling method in database design
 Kimball station, a station at the terminus of the Chicago Transit Authority's Brown Line
 Belmont station (CTA Blue Line), a station also known as Kimball
 Hotel Kimball, a historic former hotel in Springfield, Massachusetts, on the National Register of Historic Places
 Kimball International, former manufacturer of pianos and organs; currently a manufacturer of furniture and industrial electronics
 Kimball Medical Center, a hospital in Lakewood Township, New Jersey
 Kimball tag, a form of stock control label, often attached to items via a plastic toggle, using a "Kimball gun"
 , a United States Coast Guard cutter

See also
 Kimble (disambiguation)
 Kim (disambiguation)
 Kimberley (disambiguation)
 Kimberly (disambiguation)
 Kimiko